Best Of: Hollywood a Go-Go is an L.A. Guns Greatest Hits album released in Japan in 1996.

It is one of the only LA Guns albums bearing the name 'Best of' truly being a Best of, as opposed to re-recordings of hits albums like Greatest Hits and Black Beauties.

Track listing
"Sex Action"
"Never Enough"
"Electric Gypsy"
"Kiss My Love Goodbye"
"Ballad of Jayne"
"One More Reason"
"Wild Obsession"
"Kill That Girl"
"Rip and Tear"
"No Mercy"
"Killing Machine"
"Dirty Luv"
"Malaria"
"Long Time Dead"
"Some Lie 4 Love"
"Face Down"
"Hollywood Tease"
"I Wanna Be Your Man"
"Sex Action" (live)

1994 greatest hits albums
L.A. Guns compilation albums